Sofie Persson (born 13 July 1992) is a Swedish soccer player, who last played for Brisbane Roar in the Australian W-League. She previously played for Lindsdals IF and IFK Kalmar in Sweden.

Playing career

Club 
Mitchelton FC 2020–Present

Richlands Lions 2019–Present

Persson recently signed with the Richlands Lions for the 2019 season and has already helped the team to many victories scoring a season high 5 goals against Mitchelton.

Brisbane Roar, 2015–2016
Persson signed with the Brisbane Roar for the 2015–16 W-League season and helped the team finish in fourth place during the regular season securing a berth to the playoffs. During the semifinal match against regular season champions Melbourne City, Brisbane was defeated 5–4 in a penalty kick shootout after 120 minutes of regular and overtime produced no goals for either side.

Sofie has noted that she hails Georgia Muir as her footballing hero and has displayed her delight at getting to play alongside her for Mitchelton FC.

See also

References

Further reading
 Grainey, Timothy (2012), Beyond Bend It Like Beckham: The Global Phenomenon of Women's Soccer, University of Nebraska Press, 
 Stewart, Barbara (2012), Women's Soccer: The Passionate Game, Greystone Books,

External links

1992 births
Living people
Australian women's soccer players
Brisbane Roar FC (A-League Women) players
A-League Women players
Women's association football forwards
IFK Kalmar players
Lindsdals IF players